Isabella Frances Romer (1798–1852) was an English novelist, travel writer and biographer from London.

Life
The daughter of an army officer, Major-General John William Augustus Romer, and his wife Marianne, née Cuthbert, she was baptised at Marylebone, Middlesex, now part of the City of Westminster. She had at least one brother, John, but little is known of her private life. She married Major Hamerton of the 7th Fusiliers in 1818, but separated from him in 1827 and reverted to her maiden name. She died of cancer in Belgravia, London on 27 April 1852.

Works
Romer gained a reputation mainly as a travel writer, based mainly on the volumes The Rhone, the Darro, and the Guadalquivir. A Summer Ramble in 1842 (1843, reprinted in 1847), A Pilgrimage to the Temples and Tombs of Egypt, Nubia and Palestine in 1845–6 (1846), and The Bird of Passage, or, Flying Glimpses of Many Lands (1849), the last consisting of "a series of short stories set in Eastern Europe & the Middle East."

Romer's first book was a fictionalized account of a controversial technique: Sturmer: a Tale of Mesmerism (1841). It warned of the danger in the deep influence supposedly exerted on a patient by the mesmeriser. She began in 1840 to contribute sketches and short stories to Bentley's Miscellany and other periodicals, including the great rival to Bentley's, Henry Colburn's New Monthly Magazine. Her biography of Marie Thérèse Charlotte, Duchess of Angoulême, was completed after her death by John Doran (1807–1878) and published in 1852 as Filia Dolorosa.

Romer was described by a near-contemporary, the Irish writer Richard Robert Madden, as a "shrewd, lively, mystery-loving, and 'a leetle conceited,' occasional authoress, prone to expatiate rather extensively on themes merely personal, and regarding her own feelings, but always redeeming slight defects of that nature by vivid delineations, and smart, interesting, and entertaining descriptions." The same author said that her descriptions of Palestine were "abounding more in sprightliness than spirituality."

External resources
 The full text of Romer's 1842 story 'The Necromancer' with some introductory remarks: Retrieved 8 January 2013.
 Some frequently cited passages from Romer's novel Sturmer...: Retrieved 8 January 2013.
 Some letters from Romer to Marguerite Gardiner, Countess of Blessington: Richard Robert Madden: The Literary Life and Correspondence of the Countess of Blessington, Vol. I. (London: T. C. Newby, 1855), p. 329–35. Retrieved 8 January 2013.
 The National Portrait Gallery in London has an 1847 pencil and chalk drawing of Romer by Alfred, Count D'Orsay. Retrieved 1 November 2013.

References

1798 births
1852 deaths
19th-century British women writers
19th-century British writers
Writers from London
People from Marylebone
People from Belgravia
Hypnosis
British women travel writers
English travel writers